The Sixteenth Van Cliburn International Piano Competition took place in Fort Worth, Texas, USA from June 2 to 18, 2022 with 30 competitors from 14 countries. It was postponed one year from its regular quadrennial cycle in 2021 due to Covid-19.  The edition's theme was "The World is Listening" and celebrated 60 years since its founding in 1962.

In light of the 2022 Russian invasion of Ukraine, The Cliburn faced pressure to ban Russian participants from the competition but ultimately chose to allow them; however, they also warned competitors that statements in support of the invasion or Russian president Vladimir Putin could result in disqualification. Two Russian competitors (Anna Geniushene and Ilya Shmukler) and the sole Ukrainian competitor (Dmytro Choni) reached the final round.

Eighteen-year-old Yunchan Lim of South Korea won the competition and gold medal. He became the second South Korean to win the competition, after Yekwon Sunwoo in the previous competition in 2017. Anna Geniushene, 31, of Russia won the silver medal, and Dmytro Choni, 28, of Ukraine won the bronze medal.

Competition results, by rounds

Screening auditions

 Fort Worth, Texas - PepsiCo Recital Hall, Texas Christian University, March 6–12, 2022

Seventy-two applicants accepted for a screening audition chosen from 388 total applicants from 51 countries were required to give a 25-minute recital before a live audience and the Screening Jury. Unlike the previous competition, which also had screening auditions in New York City, Asia, and Europe, this competition's screening auditions were solely in Fort Worth.

  Tianxu An, age 23
  Julius Asal, 25
  Adam Balogh, 24
  Ivan Bessonov, 19
  Daniel Borovitzky, 30
  Rachel Breen, 25
  Yangrui Cai, 21
   Albert Cano Smit, 25
  Dominic Cheli, 28
  Jiarui Cheng, 23
  Sae Yoon Chon, 26
  Dmytro Choni, 28
  Kyubin Chung, 25
  Tatiana Dorokhova, 30
  Théo Fouchenneret, 28
  Federico Gad Crema, 23
  Anna Geniushene, 31
  Francesco Granata, 23
  Arseniy Gusev, 23
  Chi-Ho Han, 30
  George Harliono, 21
  Minsoo Hong, 29
  So Hyang In, 30
   Carter Johnson, 25
  Masaya Kamei, 20
  Uladzislau Khandohi, 20
  Andrew Hyungdo Kim, 26
  Do-Hyun Kim, 27
  Honggi Kim, 30
  Hyelim Kim, 25
  Junhyung Kim, 24
   Maxim Kinasov, 28
  Elizaveta Kliuchereva, 23
  Aleksandr Kliuchko, 21
  Taek Gi Lee, 25
  Shuan Hern Lee, 19
  Andrew Li, 22
  Siqian Li, 29
  Xiaoxuan Li, 20
  Ying Li, 24
  Yuzhang Li, 22
  Yunchan Lim, 18
  Denis Linnik, 26
  Kate Liu, 28
  Ziyu Liu, 24
  An-Chi Mai, 20
  Jonathan Mak, 25
   Dimitri Malignan, 24
  Aidan Mikdad, 20
  Arsenii Mun, 23
  Georgijs Osokins, 27
  Jinhyung Park, 26
  Kyoungsun Park, 30
  Yeon-Min Park, 31
  Vladimir Petrov, 25
  Philipp Scheucher, 29
  Changyong Shin, 28
  Ilya Shmukler, 27
  Vitaly Starikov, 27
  Clayton Stephenson, 23
  Yutong Sun, 26
   Marcel Tadokoro, 28
  Sergey Tanin, 26
  Arseny Tarasevich-Nikolaev, 29
  Julian Trevelyan, 23
  Alexander Ullman, 30
  Anastasia Vorotnaya, 27
  Wynona Yinuo Wang, 25
  Jiacheng Xiong, 25
  Yuki Yoshimi, 22
  Jihyung Youn, 23
  Xiaolu Zang, 22

Preliminary round
 Fort Worth, Texas - Van Cliburn Concert Hall, Texas Christian University, June 2–4, 2022

Thirty competitors from 14 countries, selected solely on their artistry and announced on March 30, 2022, performed a 40-minute recital, which included the commissioned work, Fanfare Toccata, of 4–6 minutes by Stephen Hough.

  Tianxu An, age 23
  Yangrui Cai, 21
   Albert Cano Smit, 25
  Dmytro Choni, 28
  Federico Gad Crema, 23
  Anna Geniushene, 31
  Francesco Granata, 23
  Arseniy Gusev, 23
  Masaya Kamei, 20
  Uladzislau Khandohi, 20
  Honggi Kim, 30
  Elizaveta Kliuchereva, 23
  Shuan Hern Lee, 19
  Andrew Li, 22
  Yunchan Lim, 18
  Denis Linnik, 26
  Kate Liu, 28
  Ziyu Liu, 24
  Jonathan Mak, 25
  Georgijs Osokins, 27
  Jinhyung Park, 26
  Changyong Shin, 28
  Ilya Shmukler, 27
  Vitaly Starikov, 27
  Clayton Stephenson, 23
  Yutong Sun, 26
   Marcel Tadokoro, 28
  Sergey Tanin, 26
  Yuki Yoshimi, 22
  Xiaolu Zang, 22

Quarterfinal round
 Fort Worth, Texas - Van Cliburn Concert Hall, Texas Christian University, June 5–6, 2022

Eighteen competitors performed a 40-minute recital.

   Albert Cano Smit, 25
  Dmytro Choni, 28
  Federico Gad Crema, 23
  Anna Geniushene, 31
  Masaya Kamei, 20
  Uladzislau Khandohi, 20
  Honggi Kim, 30
  Andrew Li, 22
  Yunchan Lim, 18
  Denis Linnik, 26
  Kate Liu, 28
  Jinhyung Park, 26
  Changyong Shin, 28
  Ilya Shmukler, 27
  Clayton Stephenson, 23
  Yutong Sun, 26
   Marcel Tadokoro, 28
  Yuki Yoshimi, 22

Semifinal round
 Fort Worth, Texas - Bass Performance Hall, June 8–12, 2022

Twelve competitors in two phases:
 a 60-minute recital
 a Mozart concerto, selected from a list, with the Fort Worth Symphony Orchestra and conductor Nicholas McGegan

  Dmytro Choni, 28
  Anna Geniushene, 31
  Masaya Kamei, 20
  Uladzislau Khandohi, 20
  Honggi Kim, 30
  Yunchan Lim, 18
  Jinhyung Park, 26
  Changyong Shin, 28
  Ilya Shmukler, 27
  Clayton Stephenson, 23
  Yutong Sun, 26
   Marcel Tadokoro, 28

Final round
 Fort Worth, Texas - Bass Performance Hall, June 14–15 and 17–18, 2022

Six competitors each performed two concertos selected from two separate lists, with the Fort Worth Symphony Orchestra and conductor Marin Alsop.

  Dmytro Choni, 28, 3rd place, Bronze medal
  Anna Geniushene, 31, 2nd place, Silver medal 
  Uladzislau Khandohi, 20
  Yunchan Lim, 18, 1st place, Gold medal 
  Ilya Shmukler, 27
  Clayton Stephenson, 23

References

Van Cliburn International Piano Competition